In cryptography, ARIA is a block cipher designed in 2003 by a large group of South Korean researchers. In 2004, the Korean Agency for Technology and Standards selected it as a standard cryptographic technique.

The algorithm uses a substitution–permutation network structure based on AES. The interface is the same as AES: 128-bit block size with key size of 128, 192, or 256 bits. The number of rounds is 12, 14, or 16, depending on the key size. ARIA uses two 8×8-bit S-boxes and their inverses in alternate rounds; one of these is the Rijndael S-box.

The key schedule processes the key using a 3-round 256-bit Feistel cipher, with the binary expansion of 1/ as a source of "nothing up my sleeve numbers".

Implementations 
The reference source code of ARIA cipher implemented in C, C++, and Java can be downloaded from KISA's cryptography use activation webpage.

Standardization 
 KATS
 KS X 1213:2004
 IETF
 Algorithm
 : A Description of the ARIA Encryption Algorithm
 TLS/SSL
 : Addition of the ARIA Cipher Suites to Transport Layer Security (TLS)
 SRTP
 : The ARIA Algorithm and Its Use with the Secure Real-Time Transport Protocol (SRTP)

Security

References

External links
 ARIA home
 Lazarus/Delphi port of ARIA

Block ciphers
Standards of South Korea